St David's Catholic Sixth Form College is a sixth form college located in Cardiff, Wales. It is the only Roman Catholic sixth form college in Wales. St. David's College is consistently rated good and excellent by Estyn inspectors.

History 
St. David's College opened in 1987, with an age range between 16 and 19 years. It occupies the building previously used by Heathfield High School, a defunct Roman Catholic High School. The majority of students live in Cardiff, although admissions priority is given to students from Roman Catholic secondary schools in the surrounding area. These schools include Corpus Christi High School, Mary Immaculate High School and St Illtyd's Catholic High School.

In 2019, controversy arose when Rhondda Cynon Taf County Borough Council planned to close the sixth forms of Pontypridd High School, Hawthorn High School, and Cardinal Newman Roman Catholic School, Rhydyfelin, with a significant number of pupils potentially being diverted to St. David's College (particularly from Cardinal Newman). Outcries led to an appeal in the High Court, which ruled in favour of protecting places at the existing sixth forms.

Academics 
Courses offered by St David's include GCSEs, BTECs, A levels and the Welsh Baccalaureate. Nearly 30 different AS and A Level courses are offered. In addition to the Level 2 and Level 3 courses offered, a Level 4 'Honours Programme' is available to students aspiring to go to prestigious universities such as Oxford and Cambridge.

Pastoral Support 
The college has a dedicated chapel for prayer, reflection and mass. According to a 2019 survey, the largest religious group that students identified as was Catholic.

Notable Alumni 
 Jeremiah Azu, Welsh and British athlete
 Jessica Leigh Jones, engineer and astrophysicist

References

External links
2010 Estyn Inspection Report
2014 Estyn Annual Review of Performance
2019 Estyn Inspection Report

Education in Cardiff
Sixth form colleges in Wales
Buildings and structures in Cardiff
Educational institutions established in 1987
1987 establishments in Wales
Catholic secondary schools in the Archdiocese of Cardiff